Veritatis gaudium (The Joy of Truth) is an apostolic constitution on ecclesiastical universities and faculties. It was signed by Pope Francis on 8 December 2017 and was promulgated on 29 January 2018. It updates the 1979 apostolic constitution Sapientia christiana. The document is 87 pages in length. The new norms took legal effect on the first day of the 2018-2019 academic year or of the 2019 academic year, depending on the school year of particular institutions.

Scope

The document deals only with ecclesiastical universities and faculties, which are distinguished from Catholic institutions of higher education generally in that they offer degrees granted by authority of the Holy See. Ex corde ecclesiae is not affected by the new document and remains unchanged. It replaces the norms of the apostolic constitution Sapientia christiana, promulgated by Pope John Paul II on 15 April 1979. The document obrogates all laws, customs, and privileges contrary to Veritatis gaudium.

Structure
The first part ("common norms") deals with the nature and purpose of ecclesiastical universities and faculties. The second part ("special norms") deals with specific norms regarding faculties of theology, canon law, and philosophy.

Innovations
The document makes provision for "distance learning", something which had not existed at the time of Sapientia christiana. The document also makes provision for refugees and migrants for whom production of the requisite academic verifications would be impossible.

References

External links
Veritatis gaudium, English text, Vatican.va
Veritatis gaudium, English text (Vatican approved), Zenit.org

Catholic education
2018 documents
Apostolic constitutions of Pope Francis
Latin texts
2018 in law
2018 in Vatican City